Muhammad Hafiz Ramadan Pasha (died 1955) was an Egyptian lawyer, editor, and politician. He was head of the Watani Party in the 1920s and Minister of Social Affairs and Minister of Justice during the 1940s.

Career
Hafiz Ramadan Pasha was born and died in Cairo. He graduated from the Khedivial Law School in 1904. He succeeded Muhammad Farid as head of the Watani Party in 1923, and was elected head of the Lawyers' Guild in 1926. He became lead of the opposition in parliament in 1926.

Hafiz Ramadan Pasha held the following cabinet posts:
 Minister of State (30 December 1937 – 27 April 1938) in the Second Muhammad Mahmoud Pasha Cabinet
 Minister of Social Affairs (27 June 1940 – 14 November 1940) in the Hassan Sabry Pasha Cabinet
 Minister of Justice (8 October 1944 – 15 January 1945) in the First Ahmad Mahir Cabinet
 Minister of Justice (15 January 1945 – 24 February 1945) in the Second Ahmad Mahir Cabinet
 Minister of Justice (24 February 1945-December 1945) in the First Mahmud Fahmi al-Nuqrashi Pasha Cabinet

Published Works
 Abu al-Hul Qala Li, volume 1 (1944). 
 Ṣafḥah siyāsīyah : majmūʻat khuṭab fī al-ḥamalāt al-intikhābīyah sanat 1913 (1923).
 Ahadith wa Mudhakkirat fi al-Qadiya al-Misriya.

References

Justice ministers of Egypt
Egyptian pashas
20th-century Egyptian people
1955 deaths